Scott Melville (born August 4, 1966) is a former professional tennis player from the United States.  

Melville enjoyed most of his tennis success while playing doubles because of injuries. During his career, he won nine doubles titles and finished runner-up an additional seven times. Partnering Rick Leach in doubles, Melville finished runner-up at the 1995 Wimbledon Championships. He achieved a career-high doubles ranking of World No. 17 in 1996. He is now a coach and has coached many college level tennis players.

Melville resided in Ponte Vedra Beach, Florida when on the tour.

Career finals

Doubles (9 titles, 7 runner-ups)

Doubles performance timeline

External links
 
 

American male tennis players
People from Fort Ord, California
People from Ponte Vedra Beach, Florida
Rice Owls men's tennis players
Tennis people from California
Tennis people from Florida
USC Trojans men's tennis players
Living people
1966 births